The Hewitt's red rock hare (Pronolagus saundersiae) is a species of mammal in the family Leporidae. It had previously been classified as a subspecies of Pronolagus rupestris, but is now regarded as its own species due to differences in morphology and genetic differences in cytochrome b, and 12S rRNA.

Taxonomic history

This species was named by John Hewitt (1880–1961), who was the director of the Albany Museum, South Africa. Hewitt originally described this taxon as a subspecies of Pronolagus crassicaudatus in his 1927 description. Its type locality was Grahamstown.

He described this taxon based and skulls from Albany district, collected by Enid Saunders and Frank Bowker; the species is named after Saunders.

It was later classified as a subspecies of Pronolagus rupestris by various zoologists, including Ellerman, Morrison-Scott and Hayman, as well as Hoffman and Smith for the third edition of Mammal Species of the World.

Works which list it as its own species include: the IUCN Red List, Mammals of Africa, and Jonathan Kingdon's field guide.

References

Works cited

Further reading

 
 

Pronolagus
Mammals described in 1927
Taxa named by John Hewitt (herpetologist)